Kartal is a district of Istanbul, Turkey.

Kartal may also refer to:

Places

Turkey
 Kartal (Istanbul Metro), an underground railway station on the M4 line
 Kartal railway station, a surface railway station on the Marmaray line in Istanbul
 Kartal Anadolu Lisesi, an Anatolian High School in Istanbul
 Kartal Cemevi, a cemevi of Alevi Moslems in Istanbul
 Kartal Park, Istanbul, an urban public park

Other countries
 Kartal, Hungary, a village in Pest County
 Kartal Lake, a lake in Ukraine; see List of Ramsar sites in Ukraine

People
 Kartal (name)

Other uses
 Kartal S.K., a sports club in Istanbul
 Kartal-class fast attack craft, a class of missile and torpedo boats of the Turkish Navy
 Tofaş Kartal, a car model

See also
 Khartal, an Indian musical instrument

Turkish-language surnames
Turkish masculine given names